Childress Municipal Airport  is a public use airport located four nautical miles (5 mi, 7 km) west of the central business district of Childress, a city in Childress County, Texas, United States. The airport is owned by the City of Childress.

History
The airport was opened in October 1942 as Childress Army Airfield and was used by the United States Army Air Forces as a training base.

Childress AAF operated as a bombardier-training school under the Central Flying Training Command. Construction of the field was announced on 2 May 1942, and began immediately thereafter. After the field was closed on December 21, 1945, it was donated to the city and transformed into a municipal airport.

Facilities and aircraft 
Childress Municipal Airport covers an area of 2,500 acres (1,012 ha) at an elevation of 1,954 feet (596 m) above mean sea level. It has two asphalt paved runways: 18/36 is 5,949 by 75 feet (1,813 x 23 m) and 4/22 is 4,425 by 60 feet (1,349 x 18 m).

For the 12-month period ending July 27, 2009, the airport had 3,040 aircraft operations, an average of 253 per month: 99% general aviation and 1% military.
At that time there were 15 aircraft based at this airport: 80% single-engine, 7% helicopter, and 13% ultralight.

References

External links 
  from Texas DOT Airport Directory
 Aerial image as of March 1997 from USGS The National Map
 

Airports in Texas
Buildings and structures in Childress County, Texas
Transportation in Childress County, Texas
Airports established in 1942
1942 establishments in Texas